Pleasant River may refer to

Canada
 Pleasant River, Nova Scotia, a community in Nova Scotia, Canada

New Zealand
 Pleasant River (New Zealand), a river in Otago, New Zealand

United States
 Pleasant River (Androscoggin River), a tributary of the Androscoggin River in Oxford County, Maine
 Pleasant River (Piscataquis River), a tributary of the Piscataquis River in Piscataquis County, Maine
 Pleasant River (Pleasant Bay), a river emptying into Pleasant Bay in Washington County, Maine
 Pleasant River (Presumpscot River), a tributary of the Presumpscot River in Cumberland County, Maine

See also
East Branch Pleasant River (disambiguation)
West Branch Pleasant River (disambiguation)
Middle Branch Pleasant River